Monte San Bartolo is a mountain located in the Marche region of Italy. The mountain forms part of the Parco naturale regionale del Monte San Bartolo, a regional park of Italy. The mountain forms the beginning of the coastal hill system in the centre of Italy. This system follows the beaches of the north Adriatic Sea.

Notes

General references
 Pages by the Park Authority on Parks.it

Mountains of Marche
Mountains of the Apennines